Westwood Shores is a census-designated place (CDP) in Trinity County, Texas, United States. This was a new CDP for the 2010 census with a population of 1,162, increasing to 1,239 at the 2020 census.

Geography
Westwood Shores is located at  (30.937595, -95.325438).

Demographics 

As of the 2020 United States census, there were 1,239 people, 794 households, and 635 families residing in the CDP.

References

Census-designated places in Trinity County, Texas
Census-designated places in Texas